Laut Aao Trisha is an Indian serial on Life OK, based on the Chilean telenovela ¿Dónde está Elisa? produced by TVN, which has had many other international adaptations. It was first about an 18-year-old girl Trisha, who goes missing after a beach party with friends, and how her mother struggles to get her back. But later after a format change the serial revolves around several other criminal cases who Advocate VK along with her secretary Trisha solves.

Cast
 Bhagyashree Patwardhan as Amrita Prateek Swaika
 Eijaz Khan as A.C.P Kabir Rana
 Jai Kalra as Prateek Swaika
 Nalini Negi as Advocate Trisha Swaika
 Sumeet Vyas as Advocate Vynavin "VK" Kumar (122-present)
 Gurpreet Bedi as Suhana (122-present) (VK's Boss)
 Rishi Khurana as Inspector Abhay Singh
 Jiten Lalwani as Gaurav Swaika
 Riyanka Chanda as Shaina 
 Adita Wahi as Sonali Gaurav Swaika
 Rajeshwari Sachdev as Lavanya Swaika / Lavanya Kushan Garewal
 Ayaz Khan as Kushan Garewal
 Karan Jotwani as Vivan Swaika
 Rucha Gujarathi as Mrs. Rana (Kabir's wife)
 Abhilash Kumar as Bobby Garewal
 Omar Vani as Prem Nanda
 Bhairavi Raichura as Varsha Malhotra / Janvi Shah
 Suzi Khan as Young Trisha Swaika
 Harshaali Malhotra as Sanya Swaika
 Saar Kashyap as Ankit
 Manoj Chandila as Inspector Jagatjeet

Episodic appearances
 Rishina Kandhari as Inspector Reshma (Episode 124 & Episode 125)
 Imran Khan in Episode 124 & Episode 125
 Priya Shinde as Taapti Fauzdar (Episode 124 & Episode 125)
 Tiya Gandwani as Dr. Rita (Episode 126)
 Neetha Shetty as Shanaya (Episode 128)
 Akshay Sethi in Episode 142
 Pariva Pranati as Mallika (Episode 151 - Episode 155)
 Alefia Kapadia as Deepika (Episode 156 - Episode 160)
 Amit Dolawat as Abhay (Episode 156 - Episode 160)
 Kapil Arya as Ghatotkach (Episode 124 - Episode 175)

Guest appearances
 Santhanam as Aasaithambi (Episode 156–158)
 VTV Ganesh
 Lollu Sabha Swaminathan
 Prabhas as Ramesh (Episode 155)

References

 Add the character Meghan gerewal real name

Indian mystery television series
2014 Indian television series debuts
Hindi-language television shows
2015 Indian television series endings
Life OK original programming
Indian crime television series
Indian LGBT-related television shows